In mathematics, the Fredholm determinant is a complex-valued function which generalizes the determinant of a finite dimensional linear operator. It is defined for bounded operators on a Hilbert space which differ from the identity operator by a trace-class operator. The function is named after the mathematician Erik Ivar Fredholm.

Fredholm determinants have had many applications in mathematical physics, the most celebrated example being Gábor Szegő's limit formula, proved in response to a question raised by Lars Onsager and C. N. Yang on the spontaneous magnetization of the Ising model.

Definition
, where  is a trace-class operator.  is a group because

so  is trace class if  is. It has a natural metric given by 
, where  is the trace-class norm.

If  is a Hilbert space with inner product , then so too is the th exterior power 
 with inner product

In particular

If  is trace-class, then  is also trace-class with

This shows that the definition of the Fredholm determinant given by

makes sense.

Properties
 If  is a trace-class operator 
 
defines an entire function such that 

 The function  is continuous on trace-class operators, with 
 
One can improve this inequality slightly to the following, as noted in Chapter 5 of Simon: 

 If  is trace-class, then

Fredholm determinants of commutators
A function  from  into  is said to be differentiable if  is differentiable as a map into the trace-class operators, i.e. if the limit

exists in trace-class norm.

where 

Israel Gohberg and Mark Krein proved that if  is a differentiable function into , then  is a differentiable map into
 with

Szegő limit formula

Let  and let  be the orthogonal projection onto the Hardy space .

The commutator

is trace-class.

Let  be the Toeplitz operator on  defined by

then the additive commutator

Berger and Shaw proved that

Harold Widom used the result of Pincus-Helton-Howe to prove that

where 

He used this to give a new proof of Gábor Szegő's celebrated limit formula:

Szegő's limit formula was proved in 1951 in response to a question raised by the work Lars Onsager and C. N. Yang on the calculation of the spontaneous magnetization for the Ising model. The formula of Widom, which leads quite quickly to Szegő's limit formula, is also equivalent to the duality between bosons and fermions in conformal field theory. A singular version of Szegő's limit formula for functions supported on an arc of the circle was proved by Widom; it has been applied to establish probabilistic results on the eigenvalue distribution of random unitary matrices.

Informal presentation for the case of integral operators 
The section below provides an informal definition for the Fredholm determinant of  when the trace-class operator  is an integral operator given by a kernel . A proper definition requires a presentation showing that each of the manipulations are well-defined, convergent, and so on, for the given situation for which the Fredholm determinant is contemplated.  Since the kernel  may be defined for a large variety of Hilbert spaces and Banach spaces, this is a non-trivial exercise.

The Fredholm determinant may be defined as

where  is an integral operator. The trace of the operator  and its alternating powers is given in terms of the kernel  by

and

and in general

The trace is well-defined for these kernels, since these are trace-class or nuclear operators.

Applications

The Fredholm determinant was used by physicist John A. Wheeler (1937, Phys. Rev. 52:1107) to help provide mathematical description of the wavefunction for a composite nucleus composed of antisymmetrized combination of partial wavefunctions by the method of Resonating Group Structure.  This method corresponds to the various possible ways of distributing the energy of neutrons and protons into fundamental boson and fermion nucleon cluster groups or building blocks such as the alpha-particle, helium-3, deuterium, triton, di-neutron, etc. When applied to the method of Resonating Group Structure for beta and alpha stable isotopes, use of the Fredholm determinant: (1) determines the energy values of the composite system, and (2) determines scattering and disintegration cross sections. The method of Resonating Group Structure of Wheeler provides the theoretical bases for all subsequent Nucleon Cluster Models and associated cluster energy dynamics for all light and heavy mass isotopes (see review of Cluster Models in physics in N.D. Cook, 2006).

References

Determinants
Fredholm theory
Hilbert space
Topological tensor products